Robert Ludvigovich Bartini (14 May 1897 – 6 December 1974) was an Hungarian-born Soviet aircraft designer and scientist, involved in the development of numerous successful and experimental aircraft projects. A pioneer of amphibious aircraft and ground effect vehicles, Bartini was one of the most famous engineers in the Soviet Union, nicknamed Barone Rosso (Red Baron) because of his noble descent.

Biography

Early life
Robert Bartini was born on 14 May 1897, in Fiume, Kingdom of Hungary, Austro-Hungarian Empire (now Rijeka, Croatia), the son of an unmarried 17-year-old girl of noble origins. Bartini's biological father, Lajos Orosdy (de Orosd et Bö), in italian: Lodovico Oros de Bartini, was a baron of the Austro-Hungarian nobility and the Lieutenant Governor of Fiume. Reportedly, Bartini's mother drowned herself shortly after his birth when Lodovico, a married man, refused to recognize him as his son. Bartini was eventually legitimized by Lodovico and given the title Roberto Oros di Bartini, but his custody was passed to relatives from the city of Miskolc. Despite his powerful noble background, Bartini's relatives were impoverished aristocrats, and instead they granted custody to a peasant family to raise him.

Bartini graduated from gymnasium in 1915, and upon the outbreak of the First World War was drafted into the Austro-Hungarian Army and sent to an officers' reserve school in Besztercebánya (now Banská Bystrica, Slovakia). Upon graduation in 1916, Bartini was sent to the Eastern Front where he was captured by Russian troops in June 1916 and detained at a prisoner of war camp in near Khabarovsk in the Russian Far East. He remained at the camp for the remainder of the war and was eventually released in 1920. Bartini returned home to find administration of Fiume being fought over by the local Italian and Slav populaces, as well as Italy and the Kingdom of Serbs, Croats and Slovenes, resulting in the Free State of Fiume. Bartini moved to Italy and received citizenship, where he became a member of the Italian Communist Party (ICP) and attended flying school in 1921, and began studying aerospace at the Politecnico di Milano in 1922.

Soviet Union
After the Fascist takeover in Italy in October 1922, the ICP sent Bartini to the Soviet Union as an aviation engineer, taking all the latest Italian design and avant-garde technology he was able to gather. Bartini received Soviet citizenship and changed his name to Robert Ludvigovich Bartini according to Eastern Slavic naming customs. Bartini initially worked at an airport near Khodynka Field in Moscow before occupying several engineering and command positions for the research wing of the Soviet Air Force. In 1928, Bartini began working for the Central Design Bureau building seaplanes near Sevastopol and the following year became the head of the department of amphibious experimental aircraft design, but was fired in 1930 for writing a letter to the Central Committee of the CPSU criticizing the existence of the organization. Bartini was quickly hired by the research wing of the Red Army where he began working on the Stal-series of airplanes. At the International Exhibition in Paris in August 1936, the Bartini Stal-7 broke the international speed record. He also published papers concerning aviation construction materials and technology, aerodynamics, dynamics of flight, and even theoretical physics.

In 1938, Bartini was arrested by the NKVD on charges of being an "enemy of the people" and a spy for Fascist Italy. He was extrajudicially convicted by a troika, receiving a 10-year imprisonment sentence. During his imprisonment Bartini continued his work on new aircraft designs, first at the sharashka TsKB-29, an NKVD experiment aircraft design bureau in Moscow where he worked with Andrei Tupolev designing the Tupolev Tu-2, which became one of the most important Soviet aircraft of World War II. Bartini's Stal-7 plane also became the base for the Yermolayev Yer-2 bomber, also used by the Soviet Air Force during the war. When German troops were close to Moscow during the German invasion of the Soviet Union, TsKB-29 was moved from the city to Omsk where Bartini led his own design bureau, OKB-86. His bureau was disbanded in 1943, and he began working on various transport plane projects. Bartini was released in 1946, later working at the Dimitrov Aircraft Factory in Taganrog until 1952, when he became the chief engineer of advanced aircraft designs at the Scientific Research Institute in Novosibirsk. In 1956, during the De-Stalinization under Nikita Khrushchev, Bartini was officially rehabilitated by the Soviet state. The following year he was transferred to the OKBS MAP design bureau in Lyubertsy with Pavel Vladimirovich Tsybin, and received backing from Marshal of the Soviet Union Georgy Zhukov, at the time the Minister of Defense of the USSR. Zhukov was forced out the position shortly afterwards, and most of the projects he backed were cancelled. In 1961, Bartini had proposed a nuclear-powered supersonic long-range reconnaissance aircraft.

Contributions of Bartini were well appreciated at the highest levels of the Soviet government, and he was awarded the Order of Lenin in 1967. High esteem for his contributions to defense afforded him the help from Pontecorvo and Gershtein to publish his theoretical physics paper in the prestigious Proceedings of the Soviet Academy of Sciences (Doklady). The paper was considered to be strange even by Gershtein who was asked to help edit it and prepare for publication, while after the publication some prominent physicists initially thought that "Roberto Oros di Bartini" was a fictitious name invented specially for a scientific hoax. Bartini himself was apparently very proud of his paper, signed it with his noble name, and confided in Gershtein that this was the most important contribution of his lifetime. The paper develops the idea of the dimension of spacetime which is dynamical, equal to four only on average, and presenting an argument in favor using some numerological relations between physical constants.

Ground effect vehicles

In the mid-1950s, Bartini became involved in ground effect vehicles, named ekranoplans, which the Soviet government developed a great interest in. The extensive development of these vehicles led to Bartini's first output in 1964, with the Be-1, a small prototype ekranoplan made for research by the Beriev Design Bureau. In 1968, Bartini returned to Taganrog to specifically develop seaplanes, where began development of his last known project, the Bartini Beriev VVA-14, an experimental ekranoplan featuring vertical takeoff intended to be used in anti-submarine warfare against American submarines armed with Polaris missiles.

Death
Bartini died on 6 December 1974, in Moscow, at the age of 77. He was buried at Vvedenskoye Cemetery with a grave featuring a monument with the inscription "In the land of the Soviets, he kept his oath to devote all life that the red planes flew faster than the black (ones)". Bartini had almost no contact with Italy since he had left in the 1920s. Beriev eventually cancelled the VVA-14 project as development slowed and eventually stopped after Bartini's death.

Influence
Bartini influenced many Soviet aircraft engineers, particularly Sergey Pavlovich Korolev who named Bartini as his teacher. At various times and to different degrees, Bartini has been connected with other prominent Soviet aircraft engineers such as Sergey Ilyushin, Oleg Antonov, Vladimir Myasishchev, Alexander Yakovlev and many others.

Bartini's Effect, a phenomenon in aerodynamics where drag is reduced and thrust is increased when aircraft propellers are arranged of two motors in a tandem, was named in honor of Bartini as it was first used on his DAR airplane.

List of Bartini's aircraft designs
This table of Bartini's designs incorporates information extracted from the Russian language Wikipedia article on Bartini. "(Prototype)" indicates an aircraft project where a physical example was built to some extent but was never operational. "(Draft)" indicates an aircraft project that was likely a prefeasibility study where no physical examples were built.

* Ekranolyot refers to a hybrid ground effect vehicle (ekranoplan) also capable of flight at more regular altitudes.

References
Notes

Bibliography

Chutko, I. (1978) Red aircraft. Moscow: Political Literature. (russ. И. Чутко "Красные самолёты". М. Изд. полит. литературы, 1978)
Ciampaglia, Giuseppe. La vita e gli aerei di Roberto Bartini. (In Italian) Roma, IBN Istituto Bibliografico Napoleone, 2009. .
Roberto Oros di Bartini. Some relations between physical constants. In: Doklady Acad. Nauk USSR, 1965, v.163, No.4, p. 861-864 (In English, Russian); Originally: Доклады Академии наук, 1965, т.163, №4, c.861-864.).
Roberto Oros di Bartini. Some relations between physical constants. In the collection: Problems of the Theory of Gravitation and Elementary Particles, Atomizdat, 1966, p. 249-266, in Russian only (сборник Проблемы теории гравитации и элементарных частиц, М., Атомиздат, 1966, с.249-266).
Kuznetsov O.L., Bolshakov B.E. (2000) Kuznetsov P.G. and the problem of sustainable development of the humanity in the system nature-society-man. /russ. О. Л. Кузнецов, Б. Е. Большаков. П. Г. Кузнецов и проблема устойчивого развития Человечества в системе природа—общество—человек. 2000)
Avdeev Ju. (2008) Prescient Genius, Red Star. (russ. Ю. Авдеев, (2008), Гений предвидения, "Красная звезда".) Retrieved 22-Oct-2010

Further reading
Bartini information in Russian Retrieved 14-Feb-2005.
 1989. The collection "the Bridge through time". (russ. сборник "Мост через время")

External links

A Bartini plane that was turned into an ekranoplan
Robert Ludvigovich Bartini

20th-century Italian inventors
Sharashka inmates
Soviet inventors
Soviet aerospace engineers
Scientists from Rijeka
Polytechnic University of Milan alumni
Italian people imprisoned abroad
Italian defectors to the Soviet Union
1897 births
1974 deaths
People granted political asylum in the Soviet Union
Austro-Hungarian military personnel of World War I
Burials at Vvedenskoye Cemetery